Avalon is a suburb of Lower Hutt in New Zealand, formed as a private residential development in the 1970s on land formerly occupied by market-gardens on the left (eastern) bank of the Hutt River. It features mostly California-inspired designed houses, often split-level, with 3 or 4 bedrooms. It also features one of the biggest park/playground in Lower Hutt

The Hutt City Council formally defines Avalon as the area bounded by Percy Cameron Street and the Wingate Overbridge in the north, the Hutt Valley rail line in the east, Fairway Drive and Daysh Street in the south, and the Hutt River in the west.

Avalon Studios 
Avalon came to the attention of most New Zealanders as the early centre of the country's nationwide television-broadcasting production, particularly with the opening of the purpose-built Avalon Studios in 1975. Given that New Zealand started regular public television-broadcasting for the first time in 1960, and instituted networked television in 1969 with only a single (and state-owned) channel available to viewers, the sole provider of television-broadcasting acquired a monopoly position of immense influence within the New Zealand mass media, and the name "Avalon" summarised and expressed that clout for many years.

Avalon also became the focus of New Zealand film-production - through and building on the National Film Unit, which Peter Jackson bought in the late 1990s and incorporated into his Park Road Post facility. Avalon was the filming location for the 2002 television show 100 Hours.

Television New Zealand (founded in 1980) inherited the Avalon real-estate and continued to operate some functions from Avalon, even though its activities mostly moved to Auckland in the course of the 1980s. Avalon produced television-shows such as Good Morning and the New Zealand Lotteries Commission's live Lotto draw.

Avalon Studio comprises two main buildings; a 10-storey tower and a single-story warehouse-style building. The tower is a 10-storey concrete building. The main tower was built in 1975, it was designed in a Soviet-era architecture style. It has 10-storeys with 23,000m2 of floor space, there are also a number of satellites on top. When the tower was first built it dominated the skyline in Lower Hutt City, it is still the tallest building in Avalon.

At the end of 2010 there were rumours the show Good Morning would shift to Auckland, and it was known the contract by the Totalisator Agency Board (TAB) shows Trackside (horse racing) and the Lotto draws was to end  in mid-2013. In 2011 TVNZ announced that it would sell off the site for good by 2013 and shift its remaining shows to Auckland, thus consolidating the broadcaster's Auckland focus.  

In April 2012 a consortium, Avalon Holdings, bought the Avalon Studios with the expectation of officially taking possession in early 2013. In 2017 the studio facilities were used for filming of the Scarlett Johansson starrer Ghost in the Shell (2017 film). In March 2019 an application was lodged to transform the 10-storey Avalon Tower into 61 residential units.

Demographics

Avalon had a population of 5,094 at the 2018 New Zealand census, an increase of 291 people (6.1%) since the 2013 census, and an increase of 432 people (9.3%) since the 2006 census. There were 1,974 households. There were 2,418 males and 2,676 females, giving a sex ratio of 0.9 males per female, with 900 people (17.7%) aged under 15 years, 897 (17.6%) aged 15 to 29, 2,127 (41.8%) aged 30 to 64, and 1,167 (22.9%) aged 65 or older.

Ethnicities were 57.8% European/Pākehā, 14.3% Māori, 12.9% Pacific peoples, 24.4% Asian, and 4.2% other ethnicities (totals add to more than 100% since people could identify with multiple ethnicities).

The proportion of people born overseas was 31.9%, compared with 27.1% nationally.

Although some people objected to giving their religion, 37.5% had no religion, 42.5% were Christian, 7.5% were Hindu, 2.7% were Muslim, 1.8% were Buddhist and 3.1% had other religions.

Of those at least 15 years old, 885 (21.1%) people had a bachelor or higher degree, and 843 (20.1%) people had no formal qualifications. The employment status of those at least 15 was that 1,842 (43.9%) people were employed full-time, 528 (12.6%) were part-time, and 237 (5.7%) were unemployed.

Education
Avalon has five schools.

Avalon Intermediate School is a state intermediate (Year 7–8) school, and has  students as of 
Avalon School is a state contributing primary (Year 1–6) school, and has  students as of 
Kimi Ora School is a state special school for students with physical disabilities, and has  students as of 
Naenae College is a state secondary (Year 9–13) school, and has  students as of  The school opened in 1953.
Naenae Intermediate School is a state intermediate (Year 7–8) school, and has  students as of

References

External links 
 Avalon Studios

Suburbs of Lower Hutt
Populated places on Te Awa Kairangi / Hutt River